The 2012 FIBA Under-17 World Championship for Women was an international basketball competition held in Amsterdam, Netherlands from August 17–26, 2012. It was the second edition of the Under-17 World Championships.

After their win last year, the United States successfully defended their title by defeating Spain 75–62 in the final.

Qualification
12 teams were qualified for this edition.

2011 FIBA Africa Under-16 Championship for Women

2011 FIBA Asia Under-16 Championship for Women

2011 FIBA Americas Under-16 Championship for Women

2011 FIBA Europe Under-16 Championship for Women

2011 FIBA Oceania Under-16 Championship for Women

Host country

Groups

Preliminary round
The draw was held on 10 February 2012 at Amsterdam, Netherlands.

All Times are local (UTC+2).

Group A

Group B

Knockout stage

Championship

Quarterfinals

Semifinals

Bronze medal game

Final

5th–8th playoffs

Semifinals

Seventh place playoff

Fifth place playoff

9th–12th playoffs

Semifinals

Eleventh place playoff

Ninth place playoff

Final standings

Awards

All-Tournament Team
 Diamond DeShields
 Linnae Harper
 Leticia Romero
 Yunika Nakamura
 Evelyn Mawuli

Statistical leaders

Points

Rebounds

Assists

Blocks

Steals

References

External links

2012
2012 in women's basketball
2012–13 in Dutch basketball
International women's basketball competitions hosted by the Netherlands
International youth basketball competitions hosted by the Netherlands
FIBA Under-17 World Championship for Women, 2012
2012 in youth sport
August 2012 sports events in Europe
2010s in Amsterdam